Suwannee County is a county located in the north central portion of the state of Florida. As of the 2020 census, the population was 43,474, up from 41,551 in 2010. Its county seat is Live Oak. Suwannee County was a dry county until August 2011, when the sale of alcoholic beverages became legal in the county.

History
Suwannee County was created in 1858, as railways were constructed through the area connecting it to Jacksonville, Tallahassee, and points north. It was named after the Suwannee River, which forms the county's northern, western, and much of its southern border. The word "Suwannee" may either be a corruption of the Spanish San Juan ("Saint John") or from the Cherokee sawani ("echo river").

The rural areas supported numerous lumber and turpentine camps. In the 1930s, anthropologist Zora Neale Hurston did research in North Florida timber camps.

Geography

Adjacent counties
 Hamilton County - north
 Columbia County - east
 Gilchrist County - southeast
 Lafayette County - west
 Madison County - northwest

Demographics

As of the 2020 United States census, there were 43,474 people, 15,149 households, and 10,655 families residing in the county.

As of the census of 2000, there were 34,844 people, 13,460 households, and 9,691 families residing in the county.  The population density was 51 people per square mile (20/km2).  There were 15,679 housing units at an average density of 23 per square mile (9/km2).  The racial makeup of the county was 84.53% White, 12.11% Black or African American, 0.39% Native American, 0.51% Asian, 0.04% Pacific Islander, 1.12% from other races, and 1.29% from two or more races.  4.89% of the population were Hispanic or Latino of any race.

There were 13,460 households, out of which 29.50% had children under the age of 18 living with them, 56.50% were married couples living together, 11.20% had a female householder with no husband present, and 28.00% were non-families. 23.30% of all households were made up of individuals, and 11.00% had someone living alone who was 65 years of age or older.  The average household size was 2.54 and the average family size was 2.96.

In the county, the population was spread out, with 24.00% under the age of 18, 8.50% from 18 to 24, 25.10% from 25 to 44, 25.40% from 45 to 64, and 16.90% who were 65 years of age or older.  The median age was 40 years. For every 100 females there were 95.40 males.  For every 100 females age 18 and over, there were 92.90 males.

The median income for a household in the county was $29,963, and the median income for a family was $34,032. Males had a median income of $26,256 versus $21,136 for females. The per capita income for the county was $14,678.  About 14.80% of families and 18.50% of the population were below the poverty line, including 21.90% of those under age 18 and 12.40% of those age 65 or over.

In March 2016, the county's unemployment rate was 4.8%.

Libraries
Suwannee County is served by the Suwannee River Regional Library System, which contains eight branches and also serves Hamilton and Madison counties.
 Branford
 Dowling Park
 Greenville
 Jasper
 Jennings
 Lee
 Live Oak
 Madison
 White Springs
Suwannee River Regional Library was first formed by a contractual agreement between Suwannee and Lafayette counties, making it the first regional library in Florida. In 1957, the local Library Board learned that they might get a grant for a new library if they joined with another county. The Suwannee Board convinced the Mayo Woman's Club in Lafayette County to have their county join with Suwannee County and organize the first library region in Florida. With the formation of the duo-county, Suwannee-Lafayette Library Region, it immediately received $28,224 in funds. A small library was established at Mayo in Lafayette County in October 1957. The library started as a 3,100 book collection but soon grew to some 10,000 titles, some loaned from the State Library. A bookmobile was also added and put on the road.

After being successful with its new library, the Suwannee River Regional Library System was approached by a number of nearby counties interested in the project, and in 1959 Columbia, Gilchrist, Hamilton, Madison and Taylor counties qualified for membership and became a part of the system. Greenville, Jasper, Lake City, Madison, and Perry had small libraries operated by a Woman's Club that were also absorbed into the organization. By 1960, the library system now had 23,500 books in its collection, 3,000 of which were a gift from the Miami Public Library. On August 2 of that year, Dixie County became the last one to be invited to join in. Later, the Cross City library observed its official opening December 1, 1960. In May, 1990 Madison County expanded by establishing a small satellite branch library in the Town of Lee. The Suwannee County library in Live Oak is the headquarters of the organization, as it has been since the establishment of the Suwannee River Regional Library System.

Transportation

Airports
Suwannee County is accessed by air from Suwannee County Airport, located two miles west of Live Oak. It is a publicly operated airport run by the county government that has a paved runway in excess of 4,000 feet, major aircraft maintenance, training, car rental, as well as selling 100LL aviation fuel from a manned FBO. There are also many private airparks scattered throughout the county.

Railroads
Suwannee County has one surviving railroad line. The primary one is a Florida Gulf & Atlantic Railroad line formerly owned by CSX, Seaboard System Railroad, Seaboard Coast Line Industries and  Seaboard Air Line Railroad that served Amtrak's Sunset Limited until it was truncated to New Orleans in 2005 by Hurricane Katrina. Union Depot and Atlantic Coast Line Freight Station was Suwannee County's premiere railroad station on the corner of US 129 & SR 136 in Live Oak, and served both the Atlantic Coast Line Railroad and Seaboard Air Line Railroad but has not been in use since 1971, with the termination of the Louisville and Nashville and Seaboard Coast Line's Gulf Wind (New Orleans - Jacksonville). The Seaboard Air Line operated two passenger trains a day in each direction until 1966 or 1967. Various abandoned lines also exist within the county, one of which was converted into the Suwannee River Greenway Trail, along the southeastern part of the county.

Major roads

  Interstate 10 is the main interstate highway through Swuannee County, running west and east through the panhandle from Alabama to Jacksonville. Three interchanges exist in the county at US 90 east of Falmouth, (Exit 275), US 129 in Live Oak (Exit 283), and CR 137 north of Wellborn (Exit 292).
  Interstate 75 also is an interstate highway, running south and north, but only in a remote area of eastern Suwannee County known as Pouchers Corner, and only has an interchange with SR 136 (Exit 439).
  US 27
  US 90
  US 129
  State Road 51
  State Road 136
  State Road 247

Communities

Towns
 Live Oak
 Branford

Unincorporated communities

 Beachville
 Dickert
 Dowling Park
 Ellaville
 Falmouth
 Fort Union
 Hildreth
 Houston
 Luraville
 McAlpin
 O'Brien
 Padlock
 Pouchers Corner
 Rixford
 Slade
 Suwannee Springs
 Wellborn

Politics

See also
 National Register of Historic Places listings in Suwannee County, Florida
 Suwannee County, Florida paleontological sites

Notes

References

External links

Government links/Constitutional offices
 Suwannee County Board of County Commissioners
 Suwannee County Supervisor of Elections
 Suwannee County Property Appraiser
 Suwannee County Sheriff's Office
 Suwannee County Tax Collector

Special districts
 Suwannee County Schools
 Suwannee River Water Management District

Judicial branch
 Suwannee County Clerk of Courts
  Public Defender, 3rd Judicial Circuit of Florida serving Columbia, Dixie, Hamilton, Lafayette, Madison, Suwannee, and Taylor Counties
  Office of the State Attorney, 3rd Judicial Circuit of Florida
  Circuit and County Court for the 3rd Judicial Circuit of Florida

Tourism links
 Suwannee County Chamber of Commerce

Environmental
 Suwannee River Watershed - Florida DEP

 
Florida counties
1858 establishments in Florida
Florida placenames of Native American origin
North Florida
Populated places established in 1858